The Cold War Recognition Certificate was authorized by the United States Congress in 1997 to recognize "all members of the Armed Forces and qualified Federal government civilian personnel who faithfully and honorably served the United States during the Cold War Era from September 2, 1945, to December 26, 1991". The Department of Defense designated the Department of the Army as the executive agent for the Cold War Recognition Certificate Program.

See also  
 Awards and decorations of the United States government

References

External links

 

1997 awards in the United States
1997 establishments in the United States
Aftermath of the Cold War
American awards
Awards established in 1997